Northerners A.C. is a football club based on the Channel Island of Guernsey. They are affiliated to the Guernsey Football Association and play in the FNB Priaulx League.

History
Formed in 1892, Northerners AC is the oldest club in Guernsey. Their 32 league championships also makes them the most successful club on the island.
They won the Upton Park Trophy in 2012.

References

External links
Official website

Football clubs in Guernsey